Henry Warner Birge (August 25, 1825 – June 1, 1888) was a Union Army general during the American Civil War.

Biography
Birge was born in Hartford, Connecticut.

At the opening of the Civil War Birge organized the first state regiment of three-year troops, the 4th Connecticut Infantry, in which he was appointed major. After service in Maryland and Virginia he was commissioned colonel of the 13th Connecticut Infantry in February 1862 and was placed in command of the defenses of New Orleans. In December of the latter year he was appointed to the command of a brigade, which he retained through the first Red River Campaign and at the siege of Port Hudson. He was raised to the rank of brigadier general in September 1863, served in the second Red River expedition, and subsequently commanded at Baton Rouge. In 1864 he was assigned to the command of the second division of the XIX Corps. He participated in the battles of General Sheridan's campaign in the Shenandoah valley, and in February and March 1865, was appointed to the command of the defenses of Savannah. His brigade fought in the Carolinas Campaign. After General Joseph E. Johnston surrendered, Birge again commanded the district of Savannah.

On February 25, 1865, President Abraham Lincoln nominated Birge for the award of the brevet major general, to rank from February 25, 1865, and the U.S. Senate confirmed the award on March 3, 1865. Birge resigned from the army on October 18, 1865.

See also

List of American Civil War generals (Union)

References

Sources

 Eicher, John H., and David J. Eicher, Civil War High Commands. Stanford: Stanford University Press, 2001. .
 Warner, Ezra J. Generals in Blue: Lives of the Union Commanders. Baton Rouge: Louisiana State University Press, 1964. .

1825 births
1888 deaths
People of Connecticut in the American Civil War
Union Army generals
Military personnel from Hartford, Connecticut